Versatile peroxidase (VP, hybrid peroxidase, polyvalent peroxidase) is an enzyme with systematic name reactive-black-5:hydrogen-peroxide oxidoreductase. This enzyme catalyses the following chemical reaction

 (1) Reactive Black 5 + H2O2  oxidized Reactive Black 5 + 2 H2O
 (2) donor + H2O2  oxidized donor + 2 H2O

Versatile peroxidase is a hemoprotein.

References

External links 
 

EC 1.11.1